Virion is a screen based digital art exhibition that links to public sites across Brisbane, focused in the Kelvin Grove Urban Screen Network. The Virion Screen Project was held from 19 July 2015 to 1 August 2015.

Premise

Developed by Rachael Parsons, Virion aimed to explore the internet's potential to support a democratic, networked arts culture, by employing an open curatorial process that allowed members of the general public to actively contribute to the exhibitions’ content and construction. Virion sought to maximize and  diversify Brisbane audiences’ exposure to new media practices by screening works in non-traditional & traditional locations, each creating a unique viewing experience. Virion strived to make vital connections between contemporary art, the general public and the local community and environment.

Submissions
Using the Virion website, internet users were invited to upload an image, short video work or sound work to be exhibited during the exhibition both on selected screen sites and online. The exhibition was open to all users with no selection criteria (the exception being explicit material that may be inappropriate for public spaces). Each work was given equal showing time. The ability to upload content remained open during the exhibition period. Virion provided artists the opportunity to display their work across a network of public screens and access a diverse audience. The exhibition wass open to all users from professional and emerging artists to people experimenting with cameras and scanners. Submissions could be in the form of digital stills or video files up to 1 minute each. Throughout the exhibition the audience was invited to respond and participate by contributing further content to the show. Sites were updated progressively to include all work.

Screens
Each screen played a compilation of diverse images and video that represented a wide and integrated range of local and international art practices and styles. Screens were located across a range of public, gallery and institutional sites to offer unique viewing experiences and to maximize and diversify Brisbane audiences’ exposure to new media practices.

The KGUV Screens Network was a unique and innovative method of sharing visual art and creative industries content out into the broader community, through a network of linked screens in Kelvin Grove and QUT. Screens were located at AXIOM Estate Agents, The Exchange, Blue Lotus, Urban Dental, Health Stream Fitness Club, QUT Health Clinics – Podiatry and Optometry, Queensland Academy for Creative Industries and the Creative Industries Precinct.

The Edge was The State Library of Queensland's newest initiative in 2015. It is a place for young Queenslanders; a place for experimentation and creativity, giving contemporary tools to young people to allow them to explore critical ideas, green initiatives, new design practices and media making. The Edge's physical component is at Brisbane's Cultural Centre at South Bank, housed in the former Cultural Centre Auditorium building and associated spaces. It is a state-of-the-art facility that provides creative spaces and innovative programs; a welcoming place, buzzing with people inventing, creating, presenting and meeting peers.

H-Block Gallery, located at the centre of QUT's visual arts faculty, facilitates a program of exhibitions showcasing the works of undergraduate and postgraduate students, staff and emerging artists from QUT.

References

External links
 Virion Screen Project Website
 Virion Screen Project Discussion
 Creative Industries Precinct
 Rachael Parsons
 Urban Dental
 Health Stream Fitness
 QUT Health Clinics

Internet art
New media art
Contemporary art exhibitions